The following lists events that happened during 2010 in Cape Verde.

Incumbents
President: Pedro Pires
Prime Minister: José Maria Neves

Events
March 17 census: Population: 494,649

Arts and entertainment
November 29: Mayra Andrade's album Studio 105 released

Sports

Boavista FC won the Cape Verdean Football Championship

Deaths
Codé di Dona (b. 1940)

References

 
Years of the 21st century in Cape Verde
2010s in Cape Verde
Cape Verde
Cape Verde